Fernanda Alves Schmelz (born 1976) is a Portuguese-South African model and former beauty queen who was crowned Miss República Portuguesa International 1996 and went on to win the Miss International 1996 crown in Kanazawa, Japan. She was the first woman from Portugal to win the title of Miss International.

Early life
Alves was born in Zimbabwe in 1976 to a Portuguese father and a South African mother.

Pageantry

Miss República Portuguesa
Alves first joined the Miss República Portuguesa pageant in May 1996 where she emerged as the 2nd runner-up and gained the right to represent Portugal in the Miss International pageant later that year.

Miss International 1996
Alves represented Portugal in the Miss International 1996 pageant held in Kanazawa, Japan on October 26, 1996, where she was eventually crowned as the winner by the outgoing Miss International 1995 Anne Lena Hansen of Norway.

Reference

Living people
Miss International winners
Miss International 1996 delegates
Zimbabwean people
1976 births